Mike FitzGerald (born 1985) is an Irish sportsperson.  He plays hurling with his local club Doon and with the Limerick senior inter-county team.

Career
Mike represented Limerick at minor and U-21 level without much success before graduating to the senior ranks. At third level he represented both Mary Immaculate College, Limerick and The Garda College Templemore. He lined out at half forward in The All Ireland Final 2007 where they were beaten by Kilkenny.
Mikes brother Aidan played u-21 hurling with Limerick and the family was recently featured on tg4 glor na gael

References

Teams

1985 births
Living people
Limerick inter-county hurlers
Doon hurlers